The ISO 639-3 code bnv may refer to
 Bonerif language 
 Beneraf language